This is a list of the Patriarchs of Grado (north-eastern Italy). 

The patriarchate came into being when the schismatic Patriarch of Aquileia, Paulinus (557–569), moved to Grado in the mid 6th century. But in its reunion with Rome in 606, a rival office was set up in Old-Aquileia. Initially, the patriarchs in Grado claimed the title of Patriarch of Aquileia but in the early 700s it was officially changed to Patriarch of Grado. Old-Aquileia later entered communion with Rome but was able to keep its independence and title from Grado. Throughout their history, the patriarchs of Grado, with the support of Venice, fought military, politically, and ecclesiastically the patriarchs of Aquileia, who were supported by the Lombards, then the Carolingians and the Holy Roman Emperors. The dispute between Grado and Aquileia was partially resolved in 1132 by Pope Innocent II, who restored many of the traditional episcopates to Aquileia, including the Diocese of Istria, while giving Grado the Venetian Lagoon, Split, and the Dalmatian islands of Arbe, Veglia and Ossero. Adrian IV placed the archdiocese of Zara under the jurisdiction of the Patriarchate of Grado, making it a true patriarchate with a metropolitan see under it, the only patriarchate of this kind in Western Europe besides Rome. After 1349, the patriarch of Grado and his subordinates were chosen by the venetian Senate, and the names merely sent to Rome for confirmation. In 1451, with the papal bull Regis aeterni, Nicholas V merged the see of Grado  with Castello to form the Archdiocese of Venice. The Patriarch of Venice derived its patriarchal rank from Grado. Throughout its existence, the Patriarchate of Grado was tied to the rising and powerful city of Venice, which was in the ecclesiastical jurisdiction of Grado, rather than to the small city of Grado. The Patriarchs often resided in the church of San Silvestro in Venice where they were officially 'visitors', since canon law did not allow them to reside permanently in territory of another diocese (Venice was part of the bishopric of Castello).

Patriarchs of Aquileia 

Paulinus I 557–569 
Probinus 569–570 
Elia 571–586 
Severus 586–606

Patriarchs of Aquileia nova in Grado

 Candidianus (606–612)
 Epiphanius (612–613)
 Cyprianus (613–627)
 Primogenius (630–647)
 Maximus II (649–?)
 Stephanus II (670–672)
 Agatho (?–679)
 Christophorus (682–717)
 Donatus (717–725)
 Antoninus (725–747)
 Emilianus (747–755)
 Vitalianus (755–767)
 Giovanni IV degli Antinori (767–802)
 Fortunatus (802–820)
 Giovanni V (820–825)
 Venerius Trasmondo (825–851)
 Victor I (852–858) 
 Vitalis I Partecipazio (858–?)
 Petrus I Marturio (875–878)
 Victor II Partecipazio (878–?) 
 Georgius (?)
 Vitalis II (?)
 Domenicus I Tribuno (904–?)
 Dominicus II (919–?)
 Laurentius Mastalico (?)
 Marinus Contarini (933–?)
 Bonus Blancanico (?–960)
 Vitalis III Barbolani (?)
 Vitalis IV Candiano (976–1017)
 Orso Orseolo (1018–1026, 1030–1049)
 Domenicus III Bulzano (?)
 Dominicus IV Marango (?)
 Dominicus V Cerbano (1074–1077)
 Johannes VI Saponario (?)
 Petrus II Badoer da Noale (1092–1105)

Patriarchs of Aquileia nova in Venezia

 Giovanni Gradenigo (1105–1108, 1112–1129)
 Enrico Dandolo (1134–1182)
 Giovanni Segnale (1182–1201)
 Benedetto Falier (1201–1207)
 Angelo Barozzi (1211–1238)
 Leonardo Querini (1238–1244)
 Lorenzo (1244–1255)
 Jacopo Belligno (1255)
 Angelo Maltraverso (1255–1272)
 Giovanni da Ancona (1272–1279)
 Guido (1279–1289)
 Lorenzo di Parma (1289–1295)
 Egidio da Ferrara (1295–1310)
 Angelo Motonense (1310–1313)
 Paolo de Pilastris (1313–1316)
 Marco de Vinea (1316–1318)
 Domenico (1318–1332)
 Dino di Radicofani (1332–1337)
 Andrea da Padova (1337–1355)
 Orso Delfino (1355–1361)
Fortanerius Vassalli 1361
 Francesco Querini (1367–1372)
Thomas of Frignano (1372–1383)
 Urbano (1383–1389)
 Pietro Amelio (1389–1400)
 Pietro Chauchus (1400–1406)
 Giovanni de Zambottis de Mantua (1406–1408)
 Francesco Lando (1408–1409)
 Leonardo Delfino (1409–1427)
 Biagio Molino (1427–1439)
 Marco Condulmer (1439–1445)
 Domenico Michiel (1445–1451)

In 1451 the Patriarchate of Grado was merged with the Bishopric of Castello and Venice to form the Archdiocese of Venice.

Titular Archbishops of Grado
In 1968 Pope Paul VI reestablished Grado as a titular archbishopric
 José López Ortiz (1969–1992)
 Crescenzio Sepe (1992–2001)
 Diego Causero (2001–present)

See also
Archbishop of Udine
Patriarch of Venice

Notes

Lists of patriarchs
Roman Catholic archbishops in Italy by diocese
Patriarchs
Patriarchate of Aquileia
Gra
Former Latin patriarchates
Former Roman Catholic dioceses in Italy

it:Patriarcato di Grado#Cronotassi dei patriarchi